Vase of Flowers in a Window Niche is a still life oil on canvas painting of flowers by Ambrosius Bosschaert the Elder. It was painted in 1620 and is now in the Mauritshuis in The Hague.

External links
Entry on the Mauritshuis site

Paintings in the collection of the Mauritshuis
1620 paintings
Still life paintings
Flower paintings